Stacey Williams (born April 15, 1968) is an American fashion model.

Originally from Dallas, Pennsylvania (near Wilkes-Barre), she moved to Mechanicsburg at the age of 13, and is a graduate of Cumberland Valley High School in Mechanicsburg.  Williams was featured in the Sports Illustrated Swimsuit Issues from 1992 to 1998.  She was also in the 40th anniversary issue in 2004 as part of SI's Hall of Fame.  She has also appeared in minor films such as The Dogwalker and Gangster World, and she had a brief role in the feature film, Jerry Maguire. Sonic Youth mention her and other Sports Illustrated models in their song "Swimsuit Issue".

External links

1968 births
Living people
People from Mechanicsburg, Pennsylvania
Female models from Pennsylvania
American actresses
21st-century American women